Eitan Freilich (Hebrew: איתן פרייליך) is a British Orthodox Jewish performer and singer from London, England. He achieved international celebrity status in 2016, when his first album, Am Yisrael Chai (The People of Israel Live) was released with unprecedented digital and physical sales. Whilst continually performing at Jewish weddings, concerts and other dinner events, Freilich is well known for his high energy, passion and soul he brings to each performance. Since his debut album, Eitan has released several music videos and various singles, most notably the Am Yisrael Chai' music video shot in Israel, 'Lehodos Lecha' released last summer and 'Lo Iyrah - Avidan's Song' released this April 2019 in memory of his son, Avidan. Freilich has been traveling performing at camps and concerts worldwide including Camp HASC, Las Vegas, and even nearer to home, Turnberry - Scotland. Following his sold-out concert with Avraham Fried and Beri Webber last year, Eitan released his second album 'Yavo Shalom' (Peace Will Come), an album which he believes encapsulates the years of hard work and deep learning in song - an album very close to his heart making a splash worldwide.

Musical career

Early musical career 
In April 2015, composer Yossi Green suggested Freilich should release an album of his own. Days after, Freilich officially announced he had teamed up with veteran Jewish music producer, Avi Newmark who is well known for producing for artists such as Dovid Gabay and Benny Friedman. He also worked with arranger Ian Freitor, famous for arranging songs such as Yesh Tikvah and who collaborated more recently with singer Yaakov Shwekey.

Freilich began work on the material for the upcoming debut album and worked with established composers such as: Yitzy Waldner, Ari Goldwag, Elimelech Blumstein and Elie Schwab to name a few. He was also introduced to other artists such as Baruch Levine and producer Yochi Briskman who initially advised and continually supported him along the way.

Eitan continues to perform at weddings, events and concerts. He regularly performs at charity events and performed live in New York for Camp HASC in the summer of 2016 during his world tour. Eitan often appears on various chat shows, including visiting Nachum Segal during his tour around America.

In January 2018, Eitan traveled to New York to meet with friends Yitzy Waldner, Ian Freitor, Baruch Levine, Ari Goldwag, Yossi Muller, Boroch Shalom Blesofsky and Elie Schwab. Eitan also met with Nachum Segal who conducted a live radio interview in which he announced collaborations on his new album yet to be released.

Am Yisrael Chai album release 
Weeks before the official album launch, Freilich announced he would be headlining his own exclusive concert to premiere his upcoming album. At the event, Freilich discussed his experience in the industry as well as working with Jewish composers, singers and producers, before finally announcing the name of his album: Am Yisrael Chai. The event was hailed a huge success with Freilich striking the correct balance between music, stories and  a deeper insight into the Jewish music industry.

On 10 March 2016, Freilich released his debut album which received rave reviews and high praise from professionals and music lovers alike throughout the world. Furthermore, the album trended on the official iTunes charts for world music at #2 just days after its release.

The album was featured in many high-profile newspapers and magazines across in the UK and America as well as consistently reaching #1 on Jewish Radio stations globally. Freilich appeared in various interviews, articles and video clips following his album release.

Within two months of the album release, Freilich posted a video on social media with fellow singer and friend Ari Goldwag. Days after, Goldwag announced on his official Facebook page that Eitan Freilich's hit song "Halayla" would appear on his own a cappella album.

Many tracks from Eitan Freilich's album have been translated into Spanish for his Mexican and South American fan base. Videos clips emerged online of people in Latvia, Paris and London dancing to his title track 'Am Yisrael Chai'. Freilich himself posted a video on social media singing 'Am Yisrael Chai' with his taxi driver in Jerusalem, Israel. The video went viral across all platforms in a matter of hours.

It was reported in 2015 that Freilich was close friends with fellow British singer, Shloime Gertner. A video emerged in June 2016 showing the pair singing at a wedding in London, United Kingdom.

On 1 July 2016, Freilich announced via social media that he would be releasing an official karaoke version of his album Am Yisrael Chai due to the high number of requests from both summer camps and individual fans throughout the world.

In an official interview, radio host Yossi Zweig questioned how Eitan had accumulated a huge fan base in such a short time. Freilich responded humbly: "I guess with good music, comes good fans". When producer Avi Newmark was asked what makes Eitan different from other artists he has worked with, Avi responded: "It's not always about different. Eitan has a drive for perfection and a genuine love of music, which he communicates very well. There is something here for everyone, and Eitan delivers right on point."

"Am Yisrael Chai" music video 
In 2015, Freilich announced he had teamed up with Hasidic comedian and filmmaker Mendy Pellin. Months later, Freilich spoke in a radio interview explaining he had further teamed up with a production crew led by Hadassah Chen, who had recently produced a video for American singer Yaakov Shwekey. Pellin would serve as an advisory member of the team and a new script would be written based on his original work for Freilich.

In June 2016, Freilich announced he had finished filming in Israel. He filmed across the country for seven days and the video was released on 20 September 2016.

The music video was an immediate success gaining over 130,000 views in less than one week. The video went viral on social media and was shared by various, established people and pages.

"Lehodos Lecha" single release and music video 
In 2017, Eitan announced via 'SonicDuo' on Facebook that he is working on new material whilst showing a preview of Brass being laid down in the recording studio. He has announced it will be released shortly with an impending music video on the way. The song was composed by Yitzy Waldner, produced by Sruly Meyer, arranged by Mendy Hershkowitz and vocals recorded and mixed by Ian Freitor. Artwork by Levik T. The single was released with tremendous success featured on over 20 news websites with Eitan speaking on various radio stations in interview for an example JM in the AM
.

Yavo Shalom album release  
The album was released on 10 October 2018 going to #1 on iTunes world music category.

Lo Iyrah Single - Avidan's Song release 
The single was released without warning on 11 March 2019. The single went to #1 on iTunes world music category.

Concerts and Performances   
Whilst continuing to perform at weddings across the globe, Freilich has announced shows in 2017 in both Las Vegas and New Mexico. On 16 January, Freilich performed and headlined his own show in the ArtsDepot theatre in London, selling out all seats in a matter of weeks. On 2 April 2017, Eitan also performed with Avraham Fried and Berri Webber in a special sold-out Pre-Pesach concert at the Watford Colosseum in London. Freilich is now working on new material with composer Yitzy Waldner.

Personal life 
Freilich was born into an Orthodox Jewish family in the London suburb of Hendon. His father died when he was one year old; Freilich's song "Hamalach" is dedicated to his father's memory. In 2018, Freilich announced the early arrival of his twin boys, one of whom died on 31 October 2018. Freilich married his wife, Gabriella Steinbock, on 22 October 2017 in the Park Plaza London Riverbank Hotel  and they currently live in Hendon with their son.

Discography

Albums 
 Am Yisrael Chai (2016)
 Am Yisrael Chai (karaoke version) (2016)
 Yavo Shalom (2018)
 Lo Iyrah - Avidans Song (2019)
 Wedding Classics From Home (2020)

Singles 
 "Mehaira" (2010)
 "Lehodos Lecha" (2017)
 "Paid in Full" (2018)
 "Avidan’s Song" (2019)

Guest appearances 
 Ari Goldwag, Acapella Soul 3 – "Halayla"
 Ari Goldwag, Acapella Soul 7 – "Yom Ze"

References

1993 births
Living people
British Orthodox Jews